Synetocephalus is a genus of skeletonizing leaf beetles in the family Chrysomelidae. There are about 10 described species in Synetocephalus. They are found in North America.

Species
These 10 species belong to the genus Synetocephalus:
 Synetocephalus adenostomatus (B. White, 1942)
 Synetocephalus atricornis (Fall, 1910)
 Synetocephalus autumnalis Fall, 1910
 Synetocephalus bivittatus (J. L. LeConte, 1859)
 Synetocephalus crassicornis (Fall, 1910)
 Synetocephalus curvatus (Fall, 1910)
 Synetocephalus diegensis (Blake, 1942)
 Synetocephalus monorhabdus (Blake, 1942)
 Synetocephalus vandykei (Blake, 1942)
 Synetocephalus wallacei (Wilcox, 1965)

References

Further reading

 
 
 
 

Galerucinae
Articles created by Qbugbot
Chrysomelidae genera